Alexander Edward Brown (27 May 1908 – 3 September 1995) was one of the leading professional snooker players from the mid-1930s to the mid-1950s. Brown was a former speedway driver.

He was born in London, the son of Alexander Brown, a professional billiards player. Alec Brown became a professional player aged 14.

The official rules of both snooker and billiards state that "A cue shall be not less than 3 ft (914 mm) in length and shall show no change from the traditional tapered shape and form, with a tip, used to strike the cue-ball, secured to the thinner end." This rule was introduced following an incident on 14 November 1938 when Brown was playing Tom Newman at Thurston's Hall in the 1938/1939 Daily Mail Gold Cup. In the third frame, Brown potted a red, after which the cue ball was left amidst several reds, with only a narrow way through to the black, the only colour not , and which was near its spot. Playing this with conventional equipment would have been awkward. To the surprise of spectators, Brown produced a small fountain pen-sized cue from his vest pocket, chalked it, and played the stroke. Newman protested at this.

The referee, Charles Chambers, then inspected the implement, a strip of ebony about five inches long, with one end having a cue tip. Chambers decided to award a foul, and awarded Newman seven points. In response to questions, the referee quoted the rule that said all strokes must be made with the tip of the cue, so he did not regard the "fountain-pen cue" as a valid cue. Eight days later, the Billiards Association and Control Council, which owned the rules, met and decided to introduce a new rule, which has been developed into today's version: "A billiards cue, as recognised by the Billiards and Control Council, shall not be less than three feet in length, and shall show no substantial departure from the traditional and generally accepted shape and form.

Performance and rankings timeline

Tournament wins

References 

1908 births
1995 deaths
English snooker players
English players of English billiards
Sportspeople from London